Watergate is the Watergate scandal, a 1972 break-in at the Watergate Hotel by members of President Richard Nixon's administration and the resulting cover-up.

Watergate may also refer to:

Gates
 Watergate (architecture), a gate opening onto water, or only or mainly accessible by water
 Traitors' Gate, an entrance to the Tower of London, England
 York Watergate or Buckingham Watergate, names for the York House Watergate, London, England

Places

United States
 Watergate, Florida
 Watergate complex, an office-apartment-hotel complex built in 1967 in Washington, D.C. near a watergate onto the Potomac River

United Kingdom
 Watergate, a former area of Oxford known for its College of the Franciscans; See Haymo of Faversham
 Watergate, Chester, Cheshire
 Watergate, Cornwall
 Watergate Bay, Cornwall
 Watergate Beach, Cornwall
 Watergate Halt railway station, a defunct station in Devon
 Watergate Theatre, London, a former theatre in London, England

Arts, entertainment, and media
 Watergate (album), by American hip hop group Thirsty Fish
 Watergate (board game), a 2019 board game based on the Watergate scandal
 Watergate (documentary series), a 1994 Emmy award-winning documentary by Mick Gold
 "Watergate" (Stargate SG-1), an episode from Season 4
 Watergate, a 2012 novel by Thomas Mallon
 Watergate, an alias used by DJ Quicksilver for some of his EP's

Other uses
 Watergate salad, a dish made with pistachio pudding and whipped cream
 Watergate tapes, also known as the Nixon tapes, a collection of conversations between U.S. President Richard Nixon and various White House staff members

See also

 
 
 
 
 Gate (disambiguation)
 Gate (water transport)
 List of scandals with "-gate" suffix
 Oceangate (disambiguation)
 Rivergate (disambiguation)
 Seagate (disambiguation)
 Water (disambiguation)
 Gate valve